Paonia is a statutory town in Delta County, Colorado, United States. The population was 1,451 at the 2010 census.

History
The area was first explored in 1853 by Captain John W. Gunnison of the United States Army. Gunnison was on an expedition for the Corps of Topographical Engineers to locate a suitable pass through the Rocky Mountains.

The North Fork Valley was inhabited by the Ute people until 1880, when the Ute Indian Reservation was closed by the federal government following the infamous Meeker Massacre.

Following the closure of the reservation, the site was settled in 1880 by Samuel Wade and William Clark, who had accompanied Enos Hotchkiss to the area. The town was officially incorporated in 1902 and had its first election in July of that year. The peony roots that Samuel Wade brought with him to Colorado in 1881 inspired him to submit the Latin name for peony, Paeonia, as a town name. The post office wouldn't allow the extra vowel, so "Paeonia" became "Paonia". The full name of the flower is Paeonia mascula.

Geography
The valley lies at the foot of  Mount Lamborn to the southeast and the Grand Mesa to the northwest.

Colorado State Highway 133 touches the northwest boundary of Paonia as the highway runs up the North Fork Valley; it leads southwest  to Hotchkiss and northeast  over McClure Pass to Carbondale.

Demographics

As of the census of 2000, there were 1,497 people, 631 households, and 393 families residing in the town. The racial makeup of the town was 93.9% White, 1.3% African American, 1.0% Native American, 0.2% Asian, and 3.5% from Mixed- race or other races.

There were 631 households, out of which 28.5% had children under the age of 18 living with them, 48.2% were married couples living together, 10.8% had a female householder with no husband present, and 37.6% were non-families. 33.8% of all households were made up of individuals, and 15.4% had someone living alone who was 65 years of age or older. The average household size was 2.29 and the average family size was 2.95.

In the town, the population was spread out, with 24.4% under the age of 18, 6.9% from 18 to 24, 25.2% from 25 to 44, 21.8% from 45 to 64, and 21.6% who were 65 years of age or older. The median age was 41 years. For every 100 females, there were 93.4 males. For every 100 females age 18 and over, there were 88.8 males.

The median income for a household in the town was $31,831, and the median income for a family was $40,170. Males had a median income of $35,962 versus $17,500 for females. The per capita income for the town was $16,033. About 9.7% of families and 12.2% of the population were below the poverty line, including 12.4% of those under age 18 and 15.9% of those age 65 or over.

Paonia is home to several Christian-based faiths, and has a few churches. At one time, Paonia held the Guinness's World Record for the most churches per capita. The religious makeup of the town is 28% Catholic, 13% Mormon, 57% Protestant Christian, and 2% other.

Economy

Coal mining
The valley's principal coal mines are all now closed except for Arch Coal's West Elk Mine, Bucyrus International, a supplier of underground coal mining equipment, operates a small warehouse in Paonia for support of the underground longwall systems that are operating in the North Fork valley. Union Pacific provides service to the mine, loading 100 car trains in two hours. The most recent mine closure shuttered Bowie #2 Mine.

The community has mounted legal challenges to proposed oil and gas drilling fracking in the surrounding North Fork Valley.

Agriculture
The area around Paonia is known for its orchards which produce peaches, apples, cherries, pears, and plums. In addition, several vineyards and wineries have been established in the area, and are some of the highest wineries in North America. Five of the more well-known wineries are Alfred Eames Winery, Black Bridge Winery, Stone Cottage Cellars, Azura Cellars, and Endless Endeavor Winery. This is one of the few regions of Colorado that has successfully cultivated and bottled a pinot noir. The Paonia wineries are part of the West Elk Wineries Trail and annual Tour held the second week of June.

Some of Colorado's best livestock also comes from this region. The livestock includes cattle, sheep, poultry, and pigs.

Schools
The Delta County School District Board of Education decided in February 2021 to close separate high schools in Paonia and Hotchkiss, Colorado and build a joint high school, North Fork High School, located in Hotchkiss. Both schools have been losing students as coal mines in the area have closed. Kindergarten to 8th grade education will continue in both communities.

Media
The noted Western newspaper, High Country News, is based in Paonia. High Country News reports on the western United States and is focused on the environment, land use, and public lands issues.

Community radio station KVNF was founded in Paonia and continues to have studios in downtown Paonia. KVNF also now serves a number of towns in the North Fork and Uncompaghre valleys in western Colorado through a network of stations and translators.

Paonia does not have a local newspaper. It is served by The North Fork Times, formerly an independent paper and now a section in the Delta County Independent. The area is also served by the monthly North Fork Merchant Herald, published in nearby Hotchkiss. The weekly Mountain Valley News was published in Cedaredge and distributed widely throughout Delta County, but closed in September 2013. Their sister publication, The High Country Shopper, is published in Paonia.

Brewing
Paonia is home to two breweries. Paonia United Brewing Company (The "Pub"), a microbrewery founded in 2017, features a wide selection of ales and other popular varieties. In 2018 Chrysalis Brewery opened. It specializes in Belgian style and other barrel-aged beers which often also feature local fruits and other ingredients in season.

Climate
Paonia has a humid continental climate (Dfb) with hot summers and moderately cold winters. On average, Paonia has 246 sunny days per year. Paonia averages 14 inches of rain and 53 inches of snow per year. The average July high is 89 °F and the average January low is 14 °F.

Festivities

Paonia Cherry Days Festival
Paonia celebrates its "Cherry Days" festival annually on the week of July 4. It features parades, family and class reunions, games, arts and crafts, and musical performances. Paonia Cherry Days is one of the longest running outdoor festivals in Colorado. Started by the Paonia Lions Club in 1946, the festival continues to be run by community volunteers.

Mountain Harvest Festival
The Mountain Harvest Festival is a three-day event in downtown Paonia held during the last weekend of September. There are over 20 musical acts, poetry, an art show, a chili cook off, a street dance, crafts, wine tasting, as well as classes on canning, raising livestock, and sustainable living.

BMW rally
Paonia usually hosts an annual rally for BMW motorcycle enthusiasts, who descend upon the town in mid-summer and stay for several days. This location permits riders to see the beautiful Black Canyon of the Gunnison and challenges them to navigate through winding canyon and mountain roads. It is one of the more desirable rides and locations in Colorado.

Rainbow Gathering
In 1992 the annual Rainbow Gathering was held at nearby Overland Reservoir. An estimated 18,275 people converged on the site and lived in temporary dwellings for the summer. Many "New Agers" and members of the psychedelic community continue to reside in and around Paonia, which was the boyhood home of one of the voices and key figures of "ecstatic state" knowledge, Terence McKenna.

Paonia Film Festival
The Paradise Theater in downtown Paonia hosts a biennial film festival. The Paonia Film Festival celebrates the beauty of the Western Colorado landscape and the rich stories of the people who live there.

The 2021 Paonia Film Festival shifted to showcase filmmakers local to the Western Slope of Colorado and filmmakers through the Western United States on a two-tier system. Its event dates are November 6–7, 2021.

Pickin' in the Park
The town has live music in the park every Thursday evening during the month of August.

Notable people
 Dennis McKenna, ethnopharmacologist, research pharmacognosist, lecturer, and author
 Terence McKenna, ethnobotanist, lecturer, and author
 Robert E. Huyser, four-star general in the United States Air Force
 Thurman "Fum" McGraw – College football All-American and Super Bowl Champion.

See also

 Outline of Colorado
 Index of Colorado-related articles
 State of Colorado
 Colorado cities and towns
 Colorado municipalities
 Colorado counties
 Delta County, Colorado

References

External links

 Town of Paonia contacts
 CDOT map of the Town of Paonia
 Delta County Independent, local community weekly covering Paonia and the rest of Delta County
 Paonia Chamber of Commerce
 Cherry Days
 Paradise Theater
 Paonia Film festival
 West Elks Wine Trail & Tour
 

Towns in Delta County, Colorado
Towns in Colorado